Rômulo Borges Monteiro (born 19 September 1990), known simply as Rômulo, is a Brazilian footballer who plays as a defensive midfielder for Retrô.

Rômulo is known for his defensive abilities and initiation of attacks from the back, "He tracks his runner well and judges his tackles with composure" and is not scared to get forward.

Club career

Spartak Moscow
Rômulo signed for Spartak Moscow in the summer of 2012 for a fee of around €8 million. He missed one-and-a-half seasons due to an injury against FC Rostov.

Rômulo left Spartak Moscow on 13 January 2017, after both agreed to the mutual termination of his contract.

Flamengo
On 13 January 2017 Rômulo signed with Brazilian Série A club Flamengo a four-year contract.

Grêmio (loan)
On 3 January 2019 Grêmio signed Rômulo from Flamengo on loan until the end of the 2019 season.

International career
Rômulo played all six of Brazil's matches as they earned the silver medal at the 2012 Olympic tournament. He scored the opening goal of the 3–0 win over South Korea in the semi-final at Old Trafford, set up by Oscar.

Career statistics

Club

International

Statistics accurate as of match played 10 September 2012

International goals

Honours

Club
Vasco da Gama
Copa do Brasil: 2011

Spartak Moscow
Russian Premier League: 2016–17

 Flamengo
 Campeonato Carioca: 2017

International
Brazil
Superclásico de las Américas: 2011, 2014
Olympic Silver Medal: 2012

References

External links
 
 globoesporte.globo.com 

1990 births
Sportspeople from Piauí
Living people
Brazilian footballers
Brazil international footballers
Brazil youth international footballers
Olympic footballers of Brazil
Olympic silver medalists for Brazil
Olympic medalists in football
Association football midfielders
CR Vasco da Gama players
FC Spartak Moscow players
CR Flamengo footballers
Grêmio Foot-Ball Porto Alegrense players
Cangzhou Mighty Lions F.C. players
Retrô Futebol Clube Brasil players
Campeonato Brasileiro Série A players
Russian Premier League players
Chinese Super League players
Campeonato Brasileiro Série B players
Campeonato Pernambucano players
Medalists at the 2012 Summer Olympics
Footballers at the 2012 Summer Olympics
Brazilian expatriate footballers
Expatriate footballers in Russia
Brazilian expatriate sportspeople in Russia
Expatriate footballers in China
Brazilian expatriate sportspeople in China